Round Mott or Round Mott Community is a ghost town in western Wharton County, in the U.S. state of Texas. The community was located northwest of El Campo on FM 1300. The settlement briefly had a post office in the 1880s. A school was in existence by 1905 and served the community until 1951. Only a private home, a cell phone tower and a disused church building remained at the site in 2015.

Geography
Round Mott is situated at the intersection of FM 1300 and County Road 393. At the Round Mott crossroads, there is a church with an adjacent home and barn. A cell phone tower is located a short way to the east. Within a  radius from Round Mott there are only four additional homes. However, there are more homes along FM 1300 to the east between Round Mott and FM 1160. Lookout Creek passes  to the east of Round Mott.

History
The Round Mott community was significant enough for a post office to be opened there in 1888, but it closed two years later. By 1905, the settlement had its own school with one teacher and 13 students. Enrollment rose to 50 white and seven black pupils with two instructors in 1926. A map from 1936 showed a school, a church, several homes and two other structures in Round Mott. The school remained open until 1951 when it was absorbed by the El Campo Independent School District. A 1965 map showed only the church and a few structures. Round Mott was still marked on 1989 state highway maps, but the church and a few homes were all that were left. By 2015, the only structures remaining on the site were a residence, an abandoned brick church and a cell phone tower.

References

Unincorporated communities in Texas
Unincorporated communities in Wharton County, Texas